Canada competed at the 2016 Summer Olympics in Rio de Janeiro, Brazil, from August 5 to August 21, 2016. Since the nation's debut in 1900, Canadian athletes had appeared in every edition of the Summer Olympic Games, with the exception of the 1980 Summer Olympics in Moscow because of the country's support for the United States-led boycott. The chef de mission was Curt Harnett, appointed in April 2016 after Jean-Luc Brassard, the original chef de mission, resigned his position.

A total of 314 athletes, 128 men and 186 women over 27 sports (all of the Olympic sports except handball), represented the country, an increase of 37 athletes from 2012. The team contained 98 coaches and 107 support staff (such as doctors and physiotherapists among others). Originally, 312 athletes were named to the team, however two male athletes were added in kayaking on July 29, 2016 following the suspension of Russian athletes, thus bringing the total to 314. Canada qualified five squads in team sports, matching the record high from 1984. Canada's official goal (set by Own the Podium) for these games were at least 19 medals of any colour (an improvement of one or more from 2012), and a top 12 finish in terms of overall medals won. Canada left the games with 22 medals (ranked in the top ten in terms of overall medals), which matched the total from the 1996 Games in Atlanta, the previous high for a non-boycotted games. Canadian athletes were paid for medals earned. Gold medallists earned $20,000; silver medallists were paid $15,000; and bronze medallists $10,000, coming from the Athlete Excellence Fund.

Rosie MacLennan, trampoline gymnast who had left the 2012 Games as the sole Canadian to win gold, was honored as Canada's flagbearer at the opening ceremony. Swimmer Penny Oleksiak broke the country's Olympic record for most medals (4) won by a single Canadian athlete in any Summer Olympic Games, as well as becoming the youngest ever Canadian gold medallist. At the end of the Games, she was appointed as the flagbearer for the team at the closing ceremony, becoming Canada's youngest flag-bearer in Olympic history.

Medallists

|  style="text-align:left; width:78%; vertical-align:top;"|

|  style="text-align:left; width:22%; vertical-align:top;"|

Competitors

| width=78% align=left valign=top|
The following is the list of number of competitors participating in the Games. Note that reserves in field hockey and football are not counted in the total:

Archery

One Canadian archer qualified for the men's individual recurve by obtaining one of the eight Olympic places available from the 2015 World Archery Championships in Copenhagen, Denmark. Meanwhile, another Canadian archer was added to the squad by securing one of three available Olympic spots in the women's individual recurve at the Pan American Qualification Tournament in Medellín, Colombia. Georcy-Stéphanie Picard was named to the team on June 9, 2016. Crispin Duenas was later named to the team officially on June 29, 2016. The team was officially named on July 6, 2016.

Athletics (track and field)

Canadian athletes achieved qualifying standards in the following athletics events (up to a maximum of 3 athletes in each event): The team was selected based on the results of the 2016 Canadian Olympic Track & Field Trials. The Canadian road events have standards that are different from the IAAF and are listed below. On July 11, a team of 65 athletes (28 men and 37 women) was announced, marking the largest ever track and field team Canada has sent to the Olympics. Athletes Oluwasegun Makinde, Marissa Kurtimah and Micha Powell who were named as relay alternates did not compete in any race.

The six medals won by Canadian athletes were the most won in athletics since the 1928 Summer Olympics.

Track & road events
Men

 Athletes who participated in the heats only and received medals.

Women

Field events
Men

Women

Combined events – Men's decathlon

Combined events – Women's heptathlon

Road standards

Badminton

Canada qualified two badminton players. London 2012 Olympian Michelle Li was selected among the thirty-four individual shuttlers in the women's singles based on the BWF World Rankings as of 5 May 2016, while Martin Giuffre picked up one of the spare athlete berths (from athletes starting in both singles and a double event) as the next highest-ranked eligible player in the men's singles. The team was officially named on July 23, 2016.

Basketball

Women's tournament

Canada's women's basketball team qualified for the Olympics by winning the 2015 FIBA Americas Championships in Edmonton.

Team roster

Group play

Quarterfinals

Boxing

Canada entered three boxers to compete in three weight classes. Arthur Biyarslanov, Mandy Bujold, and Ariane Fortin secured their spots on the Olympic team at the 2016 American Qualification Tournament in Buenos Aires, Argentina. The full team was officially nominated on July 14, 2016.

Canoeing

Canada's canoeing and kayaking team consisted of eleven athletes (seven men and four women).

Slalom
Two Canadian canoeists qualified a maximum of one boat in each of the following classes through the 2015 Pan American Games. The team was selected based on the slalom canoeists' performances from the National trials in May 2016 along with stages two and three of the ICF World Cup series in La Seu d'Urgell and Pau (both held on the second and third week of June 2016). The team was officially named on June 10, 2016.

Sprint
Canadian canoeists/kayakers qualified two boats in the men's K-1 200 and women's K-1 500 m through the 2015 ICF Canoe Sprint World Championships. Meanwhile, all other boats earned their spots at the 2016 Pan American Sprint Qualifier in Gainesville, Georgia, United States, either by winning their event or when the quota place for their event passed to the highest finisher not qualified. Andréanne Langlois was officially nominated to the team on June 20, 2016. The full team was officially nominated on June 27, 2016. On July 29, 2016, Canoe Kayak Canada announced that it received two additional athlete quotas for the men's K-2 200 m event, following the suspension of the Russian kayakers. On August 1, 2016, both Ryan Cochrane and Hugues Fournel were named to the team in the men's K-2 200 m event.

Men

Women

Qualification Legend: FA = Qualify to final (medal); FB = Qualify to final B (non-medal)

Cycling

Canada qualified a total of 19 cyclists (7 men and 12 women). The full team was officially announced on June 29, 2016.

Road
Canadian riders qualified for the following quota places in the men's and women's Olympic road race (3 per gender) by virtue of their top 5 national ranking in the 2015 UCI America Tour (for men) and top 12 in the UCI World Ranking (for women).

Men

Women

Track
A total of eight Canadian track cyclists qualified. Following the completion of the 2016 UCI Track Cycling World Championships, Canadian riders accumulated spots in the women's team sprint and team pursuit, as well as the women's omnium. As a result of their place in the women's team sprint, Canada won the right to enter two riders in both women's sprint and women's keirin. Therefore, Canada were permitted to enter the maximum team size of 7 women. Although Canada failed to win a quota place in the men's team sprint, they managed to secure a single berth in the men's keirin, by virtue of their final individual UCI Olympic ranking in that event.

Sprint

Team sprint

Pursuit

Keirin

Omnium

Mountain biking
Canadian mountain bikers qualified for two men's and two women's quota places into the Olympic cross-country race, as result of the nation's tenth-place finish for men and third for women, respectively, in the UCI Olympic Ranking List of May 25, 2016.

BMX
Canadian riders qualified for one men's quota place in BMX at the Olympics, as a result of the nation's tenth-place finish in the UCI Olympic Ranking List of May 31, 2016. BMX rider and London 2012 Olympian Tory Nyhaug was among the cyclists named to Canada's Olympic team on June 29, 2016.

Diving 

Canadian divers qualified for the following individual spots and the synchronized teams at the Olympics through the 2015 FINA World Championships, the 2015 Pan American Games, and the 2016 FINA World Cup series. The diving team was officially named to the Olympic roster on June 13, 2016, featuring London 2012 bronze medallists Meaghan Benfeito and Roseline Filion. Maxim Bouchard was added to the team on June 28, 2016, after Canada received an additional quota place from FINA.

Men

Women

Equestrian

Canadian equestrian riders qualified a full squad in the team eventing and jumping competitions through the 2014 FEI World Equestrian Games and the 2015 Pan American Games respectively. Two dressage riders also qualified by virtue of a top finish from each of the individual FEI Olympic rankings (for North America) and the 2015 Pan American Games. The full team of 10 athletes was officially named on July 14, 2016.

Dressage
The Canadian team was nominated using the average of the top four results from January 1, 2016 to July 3, 2016.

Eventing
On July 29, 2016, it was announced Selena O'Hanlon was withdrawn from the eventing team (due to an injury of her horse Foxwood High, and replaced with Kathryn Robinson and Let It Bee).

"#" indicates that the score of this rider does not count in the team competition, since only the best three results of a team are counted.

Jumping
The team did not include Ian Millar, who was looking to make a record eleventh appearance at the Summer Olympics. Millar's horse was injured earlier in the year and therefore could not compete. His daughter Amy, made her Olympic debut.

"#" indicates that the score of this rider does not count in the team competition, since only the best three results of a team are counted.
* penalties for the first day of team jumping will not be carried into the second round.

Fencing

Canada entered five fencers into the Olympic competition. Joseph Polossifakis and Eleanor Harvey secured a spot on the Canadian team by virtue of a top two placement from the America region outside the world's top 14 in the FIE Adjusted Official Rankings, while Maxime Brinck-Croteau, Leonora MacKinnon, and Maximilien van Haaster were one of the two highest-ranked fencers from the America zone, not already qualified. The team was officially named on May 24, 2016.

Field hockey

Men's tournament

Canada men's field hockey team qualified for the Olympics by having achieved a top four finish at the 2014–15 Men's FIH Hockey World League Semifinals.

Team roster

Group play

Summary

Football (soccer)

Women's tournament

Canada women's football team qualified for the Olympics by virtue of second-place finish at the 2016 CONCACAF Olympic Qualifying Championship in Houston, Texas.

Team roster

Group play

Quarterfinal

Semifinal

Bronze medal match

Golf

Canada entered four golfers (two per gender) into the Olympic tournament. Graham DeLaet (world no. 148), David Hearn (world no. 127), Brooke Henderson (world no. 2), and Alena Sharp (world no. 91) qualified directly among the top 60 eligible players for their respective individual events based on the IGF World Rankings as of 11 July 2016.

Gymnastics

Artistic
Canada fielded a team of six artistic gymnasts (one man and five women). The women's team qualified through a top eight finish at the 2015 World Artistic Gymnastics Championships in Glasgow. Meanwhile, Canada claimed one male quota place in the apparatus and all-around events at the Olympic Test Event in Rio de Janeiro. The team was officially unveiled on June 30, 2016.

Men

Women
Team

Individual finals

Trampoline
Canada qualified one gymnast in the women's trampoline by virtue of a top eight finish at the 2015 World Championships in Odense, Denmark. Meanwhile, an additional Olympic berth was awarded to Jason Burnett, who finished in the top six at the 2016 Olympic Test Event in Rio de Janeiro. The team was officially unveiled on June 30, 2016.

Judo

Canada qualified a total of seven judokas for the following weight classes at the Games. Six of them (four men and two women), including London 2012 bronze medallist Antoine Valois-Fortier, were ranked among the top 22 eligible judokas for men and top 14 for women in the IJF World Ranking List of May 30, 2016, while Ecaterina Guica at women's half-lightweight (52 kg) earned a continental quota spot from the Pan American region as Canada's top-ranked judoka outside of direct qualifying position. The team was officially unveiled on June 28, 2016. Arthur Margelidon (73 kg) also qualified as being part of the top 22 eligible judokas in the world rankings, however had to withdraw after breaking his forearm in training.

Men

Women

Modern pentathlon

Canadian athletes qualified two quota spots in the women's event. Donna Vakalis secured a selection in the women's event after obtaining a top five finish at the 2015 Pan American Games. Melanie McCann qualified through the world rankings as one of the top 8 athletes not yet qualified as of June 1, 2016.

Rowing

Canada qualified a total of seven boats (26 rowers) for each of the following rowing classes into the Olympic regatta. Six rowing crews confirmed Olympic places for their boats at the 2015 FISA World Championships in Lac d'Aiguebelette, France, while the rowers competing in the men's quadruple sculls were further added to the Canadian roster with their top two finish at the 2016 European & Final Qualification Regatta in Lucerne, Switzerland. The full team was announced on June 28, 2016.

Rowing Canada decided not to enter a men's eight boat (the defending Olympic silver medallist and current world record holder) in the hopes of qualifying more competitive boats (and winning more medals).

Men

Women

Rugby sevens

Women's tournament

The Canadian women's rugby sevens team (12 athletes) qualified for the Olympics by finishing in the top four of the 2014–15 Sevens World Series.

Team roster

Group play

Quarter-final

Semi-final

Bronze medal game

Sailing

Canadian sailors qualified one boat in each of the following classes through the 2014 ISAF Sailing World Championships, the individual fleet Worlds, and North American qualifying regattas.

Olympic veterans Luke Ramsay and Nikola Girke (Nacra 17), as well as the skiff crew Danielle Boyd and Erin Rafuse (49erFX), were the first Canadian sailors to be selected for Rio on March 8, 2016, while the entire nation's Olympic sailing squad will be named by June 2016. Laser Radial sailor Brenda Bowskill was named to the team on May 9, 2016, and was followed by Finn yachtsman Tom Ramshaw a week later and 470 crew brothers Graeme and Jacob Saunders in the first week of June 2016. The team was officially unveiled on July 4, 2016.

Citing the sailors' performances and downward trend throughout the qualifying period, the Canadian Yachting Association decided to reject quota places earned in both windsurfing and 49er classes.

Men

Women

Mixed

M = Medal race; EL = Eliminated – did not advance into the medal race

Shooting

Canadian shooters achieved quota places for the following events by virtue of gold medal finishes at the 2015 Pan American Games, as long as they obtained a minimum qualifying score (MQS) by March 31, 2016. Three-time Olympic trap shooter Cynthia Meyer and two-time Pan American Games pistol champion Lynda Kiejko were officially named to the Canadian team on May 5, 2016.

Qualification Legend: Q = Qualify for the next round; q = Qualify for the bronze medal (shotgun)

Swimming

A total of 30 swimmers (10 men and 20 women) were selected to the Canadian roster for the Olympics. To secure their nomination to the Olympic team, swimmers needed to have attained a top two finish under the FINA Olympic qualifying A standard in each of the individual pool events at the Canadian Olympic Trials (April 5 to 10) in Toronto. Richard Weinberger qualified for the open water race by finishing in the top 10 at the 2015 World Aquatics Championships in Kazan, Russia. Meanwhile, Stephanie Horner qualified at the 2016 Olympic Marathon Swim Qualifier in Setubal, Portugal.

The six medals won by Canadian swimmers is the most since the 1984 Summer Olympics and the most in a fully contested Olympic swimming competition since the 1976 Summer Olympics.

Men

Women

 Swimmers who participated in the heats only and received medals.

Synchronized swimming

Canada fielded a squad of two synchronized swimmers to compete in the women's duet, by claiming the gold medal at the 2015 Pan American Games. The team was officially named on May 18, 2016.

Table tennis

Canada entered two table tennis players into the Olympic competition. Pan American Games silver medallist Eugene Wang and two-time Olympian Zhang Mo secured an Olympic spot in the men's and women's singles, respectively, by virtue of a top three finish at the North American Qualification Tournament in Toronto. The team was officially named on June 1, 2016.

Taekwondo

Canada entered one athlete into the taekwondo competition at the Olympics. 2011 Pan American Games champion Melissa Pagnotta made her Olympic debut in the women's welterweight category (67 kg) by virtue of a top two finish at the 2016 Pan American Qualification Tournament in Aguascalientes, Mexico. In May 2016, Pagnotta was officially named to the Olympic team.

Tennis

Canada entered four tennis players into the Olympic tournament. Milos Raonic (world no. 9), Vasek Pospisil (world no. 46), and Eugenie Bouchard (world no. 48) qualified directly among the top 56 eligible players for their respective singles events based on the ATP and WTA World Rankings as of June 6, 2016. Bouchard's doubles partner Gabriela Dabrowski was added to the team on June 30, 2016. On July 15, 2016, Raonic withdrew from the games, citing the Zika virus. Daniel Nestor was chosen to replace him in the men's doubles event.

Triathlon

Canada qualified five triathletes (two men and three women). All five quotas were earned through the International Triathlon Union Olympic Qualification List as of May 15, 2016. The team was officially named on June 29, 2016. All five triathletes will be making their Olympic debuts.

Volleyball

Beach
Canada qualified eight beach volleyball players. Three Canadian beach volleyball teams (one men's pair and two women's pairs) qualified directly for the Olympics by virtue of their nation's top 15 placement in the FIVB Olympic Rankings as of June 13, 2016. Meanwhile, another men's pair was added to the Canadian team by virtue of the nation's top two finish at the 2016 FIVB Continental Cup in Sochi. The team of Josh Binstock and Sam Schachter won a trial match against another pair on July 16, 2016 in North Bay, Ontario to officially qualify for the games. Canada is one of four countries (along with the host nation Brazil, Netherlands and the United States to qualify two teams in each tournament).

Indoor

Men's tournament

Canada men's volleyball team (of 12 athletes) qualified for the Olympics by virtue of a top four finish at the first World Olympic Qualifying Tournament in Tokyo, Japan, signifying the team's return to the Olympics for the first time since 1992, and the first, as a nation, since 1996.

Team roster

Group A

Quarterfinal

Weightlifting

Canada qualified one male and one female weightlifter by virtue of a top seven national finish (for men) and top four (for women), respectively, at the 2016 Pan American Championships. The team must allocate these places to individual athletes by June 20, 2016. The team was officially announced on July 25, 2016.

Wrestling

Canada qualified a total of eight wrestlers for each of the following weight classes into the Olympic competition. Two Olympic spots were secured in the women's freestyle (48 & 63 kg) at the 2015 World Championships, while the remainder of the berths were awarded to Canadian wrestlers, who progressed to the top two finals at the 2016 Pan American Qualification Tournament. Haislan Garcia claimed a spot in the men's freestyle 65 kg at the final World Qualification Tournament in Istanbul. The team was officially named on June 23, 2016.

Men's freestyle

Women's freestyle

See also
Canada at the 2015 Pan American Games
Canada at the 2016 Winter Youth Olympics
Canada at the 2016 Summer Paralympics

References

External links 

 

Nations at the 2016 Summer Olympics
2016
2016 in Canadian sports